Corinne Favre (born 15 December 1970) is a French professional ski instructor, competitive ski mountaineer, and champion mountain runner.

Biography
In November 2008 she and an accompanying Sherpa suffered a serious accident while descending from the Pumori mountain during an expedition in Nepal. After convalescing, she returned to action in the Championnat de France Vertical Race in January 2009.

Selected results

Ski mountaineering 
 1998:
 3rd, Trofeo Kima
 1999:
 1st, Tour du Rutor (together with Gloriana Pellissier)
 3rd, French national ranking
 2001:
 3rd, French national ranking
 4th, European Championship (team race together with Nathalie Bourillon)
 2002:
 1st, Trofeo Kima
 1st, Tour du Rutor (together with Carole Toïgo)
 2nd, World Championship (team race)
 4th, World Championship combined ranking
 5th, World Championship single race
 2003:
 3rd, European Championship (team race together with Véronique Lathuraz)
 5th, European Championship (single race)
 5th, European Championship (combined ranking)
 2004:
 1st, Trofeo Kima
 7th, World Championship (combined ranking)
 10th, World Championship single race
 2006:
 1st, Trofeo Kima
 3rd, World Championship team race (together with Carole Toïgo)
 3rd, World Championship relay race (together with Carole Toïgo, Véronique Lathuraz and Nathalie Bourillon)
 5th, World Championship vertical race
 2007:
 1st, Trofeo Kima
 2nd, European Championship team race (together with Véronique Lathuraz)
 2nd, European Championship relay race (together with Véronique Lathuraz and Laëtitia Roux)
 7th, European Championship vertical race
 2008:
 3rd, World Championship relay race (together with Nathalie Bourillon, Véronique Lathuraz and Valentine Fabre)
 4th, World Championship team race (together with Nathalie Bourillon)
 5th, World Championship vertical race
 10th, World Championship combined ranking
 2009:
 3rd, European Championship relay race (together with Véronique Lathuraz and Laëtitia Roux)
 2012:
 4th, European Championship relay, together with Émilie Favre and Laëtitia Roux
 7th, European Championship vertical race

Pierra Menta 

 1997: 4th, together with Nathalie Bourillon
 1998: 3rd, together with Jana Heczková
 1999: 2nd, together with Gloriana Pellissier
 2001: 2nd, together with Carole Toïgo
 2003: 3rd, together with Carole Toïgo
 2004: 2nd, together with Carole Toïgo
 2005: 3rd, together with Carole Toïgo
 2006: 4th, together with Carole Toïgo
 2007: 2nd, together with Nathalie Bourillon
 2008: 4th, together with Véronique Lathuraz
 2009: 5th, together with Magali Jacquemoud

Patrouille des Glaciers 

 1998: 3rd, together with Danielle Hacquard and Véronique Lathuraz
 2006: 2nd (together with Véronique Lathuraz and Nathalie Bourillon)
 2008: 2nd (together with Laëtitia Roux and Nathalie Bourillon)

Trofeo Mezzalama 

 2007: 2nd, together with Véronique Lathuraz and Nathalie Bourillon
 2011: 4th, together with Gabrielle Magnenat and Émilie Gex-Fabry

Sky running 
Favre won the Sentiero 4 Luglio SkyMarathon in 2002, 2003, 2007 and 2008. In 2005, she won the Pikes Peak Marathon at her first attempt, and also won the Buff Skyrunner World Series the same year after winning five of the six races in which she competed. She had previously finished second in 2003 despite winning three races, more than any other competitor, and seventh overall in 2004 after placing first and second in the only two races in which she took part. She won her second Skyrunner Series title in 2008, and is also a three-time winner of the race from Base Camp to Lukla on Mount Everest.

References

External links 
 Further race results

1970 births
Living people
French female ski mountaineers
French female long-distance runners
French female mountain runners
French sky runners
21st-century French women